Tirynthia is a genus of skipper butterflies in the family Hesperiidae.

Species
Recognised species in the genus Tirynthia include:
 Tirynthia conda Evans, [1955]
 Tirynthia conflua Herrich-Schäffer, 1869

References

Natural History Museum Lepidoptera genus database

Hesperiini
Hesperiidae genera